Kobato is a 24-episode anime adaption of the manga of the same name by CLAMP. The series premiered in the autumn of 2009, directed by Mitsuyuki Masuhara and animated by Madhouse, with scripts supervised by CLAMP's Nanase Ohkawa and xxxHolic writer Michiko Yokote. The anime began its broadcast on October 6, 2009.

Hiromi Katō, the character designer of Kobato., said "Kobato. itself is kind of different from past CLAMP works, especially the way the eyes are drawn, we are trying to make it as close as we can to the original. The costumes will change in each episode."

The opening theme, "Magic Number", is performed by Maaya Sakamoto and the ending theme Jellyfish no Kokuhaku by Megumi Nakajima.
A second ending theme, starting from episode 20, is "Watashi ni Dekiru Koto", performed by Megumi Nakajima.



Episode list
Each episode title begins with 3 periods (...) and ends with 1 Japanese period mark (。), except for the final episode that begins with up to a total of 4 periods. For example, the second episode's title is written in Japanese as "".

References

External links

Kobato. official website
NHK's official Kobato. website
Madhouse's official Kobato. website

Kobato.